Vlad Reiser (born 7 May 1993), is a Belarusian-Swedish singer and YouTuber with more than 480,000 subscribers. Reiser came to Sweden from Belarus with his family in 2002 when he was nine years old.

Vlad Reiser hosted the Nickelodeon show Hey Nickelodeon Med Vlad & Athena. Reiser has also made appearances on various Swedish TV-show, as Farmen VIP (2019) & MTV Ridiculousness (2018).

Vlad participated in Melodifestivalen 2019 with the song "Nakna i regnet", which he performed in the second semi-final. He made it to the Second Chance round.

Discography

Singles

References

Living people
1993 births
Swedish male singers
Belarusian emigrants to Sweden
Melodifestivalen contestants of 2019